Matthijs de Ligt (born 12 August 1999) is a Dutch professional footballer who plays as a centre-back for  club Bayern Munich and the Netherlands national team. Considered one of the best defenders in the world, De Ligt is known for his strength, leadership and aerial ability.

De Ligt made his debut for Ajax's senior team in September 2016 in a cup game against Willem II. He scored from a corner after 25 minutes, making him the second-youngest goalscorer ever behind Clarence Seedorf. On 24 May, he became the youngest player ever (17 years and 285 days old) to play in a major European final when he started against Manchester United in the 2017 UEFA Europa League Final. On 17 December 2018, De Ligt won the Golden Boy award, becoming the first defender to win the award. The following season, he helped Ajax capture a domestic double and reach the semi-finals of the Champions League. His performances earned him a move to Serie A club Juventus, and saw him win the Kopa Trophy in 2019. He won the Serie A title  during his first season with the Turin side.

In 2017, De Ligt made his debut for the Netherlands at the age of 17, making him the youngest player to start for the national team since 1931. He featured for the side at UEFA Euro 2020 and the 2022 FIFA World Cup.

Club career

Ajax

De Ligt joined the Ajax youth academy when he was nine years old from his local club in Abcoude, just outside of Amsterdam. At first the coaches at the youth academy thought he was too slow and out of shape, but he was given a chance to develop in the academy and went on to prove his quality.

2016–17: Jong Ajax and development
He made his debut for Jong Ajax on 8 August 2016 in an Eerste Divisie game against FC Emmen, playing the full game. During the season, De Ligt played in 17 matches for Jong Ajax.

On 21 September, De Ligt made his debut for Ajax's senior team in a cup game against Willem II. He scored from a corner after 25 minutes, making him the second-youngest goalscorer ever behind Clarence Seedorf; Ajax won the game 5–0. On 24 October, Ajax announced through Twitter that De Ligt had been promoted to the senior squad.

De Ligt quickly established himself in the first team after being promoted and went on to play in 11 league matches and nine in the Europa League. On 24 May, he became the youngest player ever (17 years and 285 days old) to play in a major European final when he started against Manchester United in the 2017 UEFA Europa League Final.

2017–19: Breakthrough and captaincy
After the sale of Davinson Sánchez to Tottenham Hotspur in August 2017, De Ligt became a first-team starter. He was named the youngest captain of Ajax in March 2018 after injury to club captain Joël Veltman.

De Ligt appeared in 37 matches in all competitions and scored three goals. He started in all of his 31 league matches and played 90 minutes in all but one of them (he was substituted in the 33rd minute against SBV Vitesse due to an injury). Due to De Ligt's performances for Ajax, he was linked with many of Europe's top clubs.

On 17 December 2018, De Ligt won the Golden Boy award, becoming the first defender to win the award. On 13 February 2019, De Ligt became the youngest ever captain in a Champions League knockout game at 19 years and 186 days old, in a game against Real Madrid. On 27 February 2019, he played his 100th official game for Ajax in a 0–3 Klassieker win against Feyenoord in the Dutch national cup, becoming the youngest Ajax player ever to reach this milestone.

On 16 April 2019, De Ligt scored the winning goal in the Champions League quarter-final against Juventus to send Ajax on to the semi-finals of the competition for the first time since the 1996–97 edition of the tournament. His goal also saw him become the youngest Dutch player to score in the knockout stages since Nordin Wooter in 1996 and the second-youngest ever defender to score after Joël Matip.

Juventus

On 18 July 2019, De Ligt signed for Serie A champions Juventus on a five-year contract for a fee of €75 million, to be paid in five annual installments, with additional costs of €10.5 million. He made his official debut for the club in a 4–3 home win over Napoli in Serie A on 31 August. On 3 November, he scored his first for the club in a 1–0 away win over cross-city rivals Torino in the Derby della Mole.

Bayern Munich
On 19 July 2022, De Ligt signed for Bundesliga champions Bayern Munich on five-year contract for a reported initial fee of €67 million, potentially rising to €77 million in add-ons. On 21 August, he scored his first Bundesliga goal in a 7–0 away win over Bochum.

On 8 March 2023, at the Champions League round of 16 second leg, he made a goal-line clearance against Paris Saint-Germain, after goalkeeper Yann Sommer lost the ball under pressure, to keep the goalless draw and scoreline at 1–0 on aggregate. The match ended in a 2–0 victory and qualification to the quarter-final.

International career
On 25 March 2017, De Ligt made his debut for the Dutch national team in a 2–0 away defeat to Bulgaria in a 2018 FIFA World Cup qualification match. National team coach, Danny Blind, called De Ligt up for the national team despite having only started two league games for Ajax. At the age of 17, he became the youngest player to start for the national team since 1931.

During the UEFA Nations League, De Ligt started and played 90 minutes in all four group matches against Germany and France as the Netherlands won the group and qualified for the inaugural Nations League Finals. In the semi-finals on 5 June, he scored a header against England as his team secured a spot in the final, where the Netherlands would be defeated 0–1 by Portugal.

On 27 June 2021, he was sent off for handball in the UEFA Euro 2020 round of 16 against Czech Republic, in which the Netherlands later conceded two goals and were eliminated from the competition.

Style of play
De Ligt is considered by pundits to be among the most highly regarded young prospects in world football, as demonstrated by his victory in the 2018 Golden Boy award, which is assigned to the most impressive young player in European football.

Having played as an attacking midfielder in his youth, De Ligt is both a physical and technically gifted right-footed centre-back, who is known for his clean tackling, anticipation, marking, height, strength, speed and accurate passing, which enables him to start attacking plays from the back. His height allows him to be a major threat from set pieces, while his strength means that he is unlikely to be pushed off the ball, particularly in aerial duels. His playing style is often compared to that of Barcelona defender Gerard Piqué; he has also been likened to Jan Vertonghen, due to his "similar forward surges, a propensity to create an extra man in midfield, and calmness on the ball," and to compatriot Ronald Koeman, courtesy of his "powerful shot and body strength."

A 2019 UEFA.com profile described De Ligt as a "natural leader [who] is an elegant two-footed central defender. Dominant in the air, he is blessed with strength, fine distribution and composure, and is able to play out from the back thanks to his confidence in possession, while his intelligent positioning helps him deny pacy forwards. With his ability to read the game, he could even play in midfield. His leadership also stands him out: he was 18 when he was made Ajax skipper." That same year, Paul Wilkes of The Independent wrote that "De Ligt's ability to play out from the back and organise his fellow teammates are valuable commodities in a time when the lack of quality defenders has been highlighted."

Former Liverpool and England defender Jamie Carragher praised De Ligt for his "physical attributes" and "leadership qualities". Carragher also said he plays "like he's 24 or 25" indicating maturity and strength. Of De Ligt, former Netherlands centre-back Jaap Stam said: "He's got composure on the ball, he's aggressive tactically, he sees the game, he reads the game well and he's got that driving force for himself as well in what you need to achieve and where you want to go to." Upon signing with Juventus, Marcello Lippi, one of the club's former managers, said of the defender's precocious performances: "I've seen plenty of greats, like Alessandro Nesta, Franco Baresi, Paolo Maldini, Ciro Ferrara, Fabio Cannavaro, and Marco Materazzi. I've never seen anyone like that at his age."

In 2019, Giacomo Chiuchiolo described De Ligt as a "complete" and talented young defender, saying that although he is not exceptionally quick, he possesses excellent positioning and an ability to read the game, among his other technical and physical qualities. Despite his talent, he has at times come under criticism in the media for being inconsistent due to his tendency to commit occasional lapses or errors. In October 2019, his Juventus defensive teammate Leonardo Bonucci said he believes that De Ligt will overcome these weaknesses with time, as he matures and gains more experience with age, and successfully adapts to the team's new defensive strategy under manager Maurizio Sarri, who uses a zonal marking system rather than man-to-man marking.

Personal life
De Ligt is in a relationship with Dutch model Annekee Molenaar, daughter of Keje Molenaar.

Career statistics

Club

International

Scores and results list the Netherlands' goal tally first, score column indicates score after each De Ligt goal

Honours
Ajax
Eredivisie: 2018–19
KNVB Cup: 2018–19
UEFA Europa League runner-up: 2016–17

Juventus
Serie A: 2019–20
Coppa Italia: 2020–21; runner-up: 2019–20, 2021–22
Supercoppa Italiana: 2020

Bayern Munich
 DFL-Supercup: 2022

Netherlands
UEFA Nations League runner-up: 2019

Individual
ABN AMRO Future Cup Best Player: 2015
Copa Amsterdam Best Player: 2015
Ajax Talent of the Future (Sjaak Swart Award): 2016
UEFA European Under-17 Championship Team of the Tournament: 2016
Ajax Talent of the Year (Marco van Basten Award): 2018
UEFA Europa League Squad of the Season: 2016–17
UEFA Champions League Squad of the Season: 2018–19
Eredivisie Team of the Year: 2017–18, 2018–19
Johan Cruyff Trophy: 2017–18
Dutch Footballer of the Year: 2018–19
Golden Boy: 2018
FIFA FIFPro World11: 2019
IFFHS Men's World Team: 2019
Kopa Trophy: 2019
UEFA Team of the Year: 2019

References

External links

Profile at the FC Bayern Munich website
Profile at the Royal Dutch Football Association website (in Dutch)

1999 births
Living people
People from Leiderdorp
Footballers from South Holland
Dutch footballers
Association football defenders
Jong Ajax players
AFC Ajax players
Juventus F.C. players
FC Bayern Munich footballers
Eerste Divisie players
Eredivisie players
Serie A players
Bundesliga players
Netherlands youth international footballers
Netherlands international footballers
UEFA Euro 2020 players
2022 FIFA World Cup players
Golden Boy winners
Dutch expatriate footballers
Expatriate footballers in Germany
Expatriate footballers in Italy
Dutch expatriate sportspeople in Germany
Dutch expatriate sportspeople in Italy